The Museum of Fine Arts of Seville is a museum in Seville, Spain, a collection of mainly Spanish visual arts from the medieval period to the early 20th century, including a choice selection of works by artists from the so-called Golden Age of Sevillian painting during the 17th century, such as Murillo, Zurbarán, Francisco de Herrera the younger, and Valdés Leal.

The building itself was built in 1594. The institution of the provincial museum of Seville was created in September 1835. Items were moved to the museum in the ensuing years. The building it is housed in was originally home to the convent of the Order of the Merced Calzada de la Asunción, founded by St. Peter Nolasco during the reign of Ferdinand III. Extensive remodeling in the early 17th century was led by the architect Juan de Oviedo y de la Bandera.

Painters and  sculptors of Museum 

{|
|- style="vertical-align: top;"
|
A - F
Pedro de Acosta
Miguel de Adán
Pieter Aertsen
Nicolás Alperiz
Francisco Antolínez
José Arpa y Perea
Matías de Arteaga
Gustavo Bacarisas
Francisco Barrera
Manuel Barrón y Carrillo
Diego Bejarano
Mariano Benlliure
Guillaume Benson
Bartolomé Bermejo
Gonzalo Bilbao
Manuel Cabral Aguado-Bejarano
Alonso Cano
Eduardo Cano
Juan José Carpio
Juan del Castillo
Pieter Coecke
Marcelo Cofferman
Lucas Cranach
José Domínguez Becquer
Valeriano Bécquer
Juan de Espinal
Antonio María Esquivel
Frans Francken I
Rosendo Fernández
Alejo Fernández

</td>G - M
José García Ramos
Guillermo Gómez Gil
Manuel González Santos
Francisco de Goya
Alfonso Grosso
Francisco Gutiérrez
Juan Simón Gutiérrez
José Gutiérrez de la Vega
Eugenio Hermoso
Francisco Herrera el Viejo
Francisco Herrera el Mozo
Jean Joseph Horemmans el viejo
Joaquín Bilbao
José Jiménez Aranda
José Lafita y Blanco
Diego López
Ricardo López Cabrera
Raimundo de Madrazo y Garreta
A Martínez Díaz
Domingo Martínez
Santiago Martínez
Juan Martínez Montañés (s)
Eduardo Martínez Vázquez
Virgilio Mattoni
Francisco Meses Osorio
Lorenzo Mercadante de Bretaña (s)
Juan de Mesa (s)
Pedro Millán (s)
Cristóbal de Morales
José Moreno CarboneroM - U
Bartolomé Esteban Murillo
Francisco Narbona
Gaspar Núñez Delgado (s)
Andrés de Ocampo (s)
Juan de Oviedo
Francisco Pacheco
Andrés Parladé
Vasco Pereira
Miguel Ángel del Pino Sardá
Pieter Pourbus
José de Ribera
José Rico Cejudo
José María Rodríguez-Acosta
Juan de Roelas
Jose Marís Romero
Antonio Ruiz Echagüe
Giovan Battista Ruoppolo
Juan Miguel Sánchez
Emilio Sánchez-Perrier
Cornelis Schut III
Vincent Sellaer
Rafael Senet
Francisco Soria Aedo
Juan de Solis
Doménikos Theotokópoulos, "El Greco"
Fernando Tirado
Clemente de Torres
Pietro Torrigiano (s)
Juan de Uceda
V-Z
Andrea Vaccaro
Valdés Leal
Lucas Valdés
Pieter van Lint
Francisco Varela
Luis de Vargas
Alonso Vázquez (painter)
Diego de Silva y Velázquez
José Villegas Cordero
Cornelis de Vos
Marten de Vos
Sebastian Vrancx
Jan Wildens
Ignacio Zuloaga
Francisco de Zurbarán
|}

Gallery

References 
Citations

Bibliography

External links
Museum Website
Virtual tour of the Museum of Fine Arts of Seville provided by Google Arts & Culture

Museums in Seville
Fine Arts, Seville
1839 establishments in Spain
Azulejos in buildings in Andalusia
Tourist attractions in Seville
Seville